The Sebewaing River is a river in Michigan that flows through Sebewaing Township, Michigan and empties into Saginaw Bay.

See also
List of rivers of Michigan

References
Michigan  Streamflow Data from the USGS

Rivers of Michigan